The Kawacatoose First Nation ( kawâhkatos) is a Plains Cree First Nations band government in Saskatchewan. Their reserves include:

 Kawacatoose 88
 Last Mountain Lake 80A
 Poorman 88
 Treaty Four Reserve Grounds 77, shared with 32 other bands.

The First Nation is named for Chief Kawacatoose, an original signatory to Treaty 4. His name derives from the Cree kawâhkatoso, "be weak with hunger". Although "hungry skinny man" is a more accurate translation, "poor man" has been used historically and is still the official name of the Poor Man 88 reserve.

References

First Nations in Saskatchewan